Neopectinimura beckeri is a moth in the family Lecithoceridae. It is found in Papua New Guinea.

The wingspan is 11.5–12 mm. The forewing ground color is yellowish-white, sparsely speckled with brownish scales and with a dark-brown discal spot at the end of the cell. There is a similar dark brown spot below the cell medially and blackish dots are present from the preapex to the tornus along the termen. The hindwings are orange grey and slightly broader than the forewings.

Etymology
The species is named for the collector, Dr. V. O. Becker who is a microlepidoptera specialist in Brazil.

References

Moths described in 2010
beckeri